Aaron James Ramsey (born 21 January 2003) is an English professional footballer who plays as a midfielder for Middlesbrough on loan from  club Aston Villa. A product of the Aston Villa Academy, he has represented England at youth level, and is currently a member of the under-20 squad. His elder brother Jacob also plays for Aston Villa.

Professional career 
Ramsey joined Aston Villa alongside his brother Jacob at under-9 level. He moved through the youth ranks, and was given his first professional contract on 16 March 2021. During his time playing for the Aston Villa U23 side, Ramsey was named by The Guardian as one of England's top young talents. On 24 May 2021, Ramsey was part of the Aston Villa U18s team that won the FA Youth Cup, beating Liverpool 2–1 in the final.

Ramsey was promoted to the first-team towards the end of the 2020–21 season, and played his first game with the senior team on 21 July 2021 - scoring in a pre-season friendly against Walsall. Ramsey made his first-team debut on 24 August 2021, in a 6–0 EFL Cup victory over Barrow.

On 11 January 2022, Ramsey joined League One club Cheltenham Town on loan until the end of the season. He made his EFL debut as a second-half substitute in a 1–0 defeat to Rotherham United on 22 January 2022. On 23 April 2022, Ramsey scored his first goal in senior football in a 1–2 home defeat for Cheltenham against Bolton Wanderers.

On 5 August 2022, Ramsey joined Championship club Norwich City on a season-long loan deal, linking up once again with former Villa manager Dean Smith. He made his debut on 9 August 2022, as a substitute in a 2–2 EFL Cup draw against Birmingham City. Norwich won the match on penalties, but Ramsey did not take part in the penalty shoot-out. He scored his first goals for the club on 29 October 2022 when he scored twice in a 3-1 win against Stoke City. In December 2022, Ramsey suffered a knee injury which required surgery. On 3 January 2023, Ramsey's loan deal with Norwich was terminated to allow him to continue his rehabilitation at Villa. 

On 31 January, 2023, Ramsey moved to Middlesbrough on loan for the rest of the season. On 15 February, he made his debut for Middlesbrough in a Championship match against Sheffield United coming on as an 82nd minute substitute for Marcus Forss. Ramsey got his first goals for Middlesbrough on 4 March 2023, scoring twice in a 5–0 victory over Reading.

International career 
Ramsey has been capped at England under-16, under-17 and under-18 level. He captained the Under-17 national team to a 2–1 victory over Germany on 14 November 2017. On 6 September 2021, after an injury to Harvey Elliott, Ramsey was called up to the England under-21 squad for the first time, ahead of their 2023 UEFA European Under-21 Championship qualification match against Kosovo. Ramsey was an unused substitute for the game.

On 6 October 2021, Ramsey made a goalscoring debut for the England U19s during a 3–1 defeat to France in Marbella.

On 17 June 2022, Ramsey was named in the England squad for the 2022 UEFA European Under-19 Championship finals. Ramsey featured in heavily in the tournament, including on 1 July 2022, scoring the final goal in England's 3–1 extra time victory over Israel in the final.

On 21 September 2022, Ramsey made his England U20 debut during a 3–0 victory over Chile at the Pinatar Arena. He scored his first goal for the U20 team, on 27 September in a 3–0 victory over Australia.

Personal life 
Ramsey lives in Great Barr. His older brother Jacob also plays for Aston Villa, whilst his younger brother Cole is in the academy set-up there. His father Mark was a boxer who twice fought Ricky Hatton, once in 1998 and once in 1999.

Career statistics

Honours 
Aston Villa U18
FA Youth Cup: 2020–21

England U19
 UEFA European Under-19 Championship: 2022

References

External links 

 AVFC Profile

2003 births
Living people
People from Great Barr
Association football midfielders
English footballers
English Football League players
England youth international footballers
Aston Villa F.C. players
Cheltenham Town F.C. players
Norwich City F.C. players
Middlesbrough F.C. players
Black British sportsmen